The women's javelin throw event at the 1995 Pan American Games was held at the Estadio Atletico "Justo Roman" on 19 March. The old model javelin was used for this competition.

Results

References

Athletics at the 1995 Pan American Games
1995
Pan